Fruit Hill, also known as the Robinson-Andrews-Hoxton House, is a Greek Revival house near Shepherdstown, West Virginia. The original two-story stone house on the property was probably built by Henry Cookus circa 1766.  This house was built over a watercourse, assuring a reliable supply of water on what was then the frontier.  The main Greek Revival house was built in the 1830s by Archibald Robinson, and the house remains in the hands of the family.  The interior of the house includes a three-story open staircase.

References

Greek Revival houses in West Virginia
Houses completed in 1766
Houses completed in 1830
Houses in Jefferson County, West Virginia
Houses on the National Register of Historic Places in West Virginia
National Register of Historic Places in Jefferson County, West Virginia
Stone houses in West Virginia
1830 establishments in Virginia